La Placita may refer to:

 La Placita, Michoacan, Mexico
 La Placita, California, U.S., a former settlement in Riverside County
 La Placita, Colorado, a former settlement in southeastern Colorado
 La Iglesia de Nuestra Señora Reina de los Angeles, nicknamed La Placita, a Catholic church in Los Angeles, California, U.S.
 Olvera Street, Los Angeles, also known as "Placita Olvera"